Góis is a municipality of the district of Coimbra, in the central part of continental Portugal. The population in 2011 was 4,260, in an area of 263.30 km².

Geography

Physical geography

The municipality is limited in the north by the municipality of Arganil, east by Pampilhosa da Serra, southwest by Pedrógão Grande and Castanheira de Pera, west by Lousã and northwest by Vila Nova de Poiares.

The environment resulted in a diverse vegetation, that includes holm oaks (Quercus rotundifolia) in the dry, sunny regions; and English oak (Quercus robur) and Pyrenean oak (Quercus pyrenaica) in the humid, colder areas. It is an area of appreciable landscape, composed of quartzite, accompanied by gravel along the flanks.

The rivers, in addition to its fishery resources, are utilized for leisure activities (including its beaches and fluvial pools).

There are a number of watercourses in the municipality, all with a permanent character that support the watersheds of the Zêzere and Mondego Rivers. The riparian vegetation, consequently, thrives: specifically, the patches of European alder (Alnus glutinosa) and communities of Portuguese laurel (Prunus lusitanica), with the presence of European holly (Ilex aquifolium). These areas include important spaces for the conservation of Iberian Emerald Lizard (Lacerta schreiberi) and particularly the Gold-Striped Salamander (Chioglossa lusitanica), also known as an area of elevated genetic diversity and major vulnerability.

Human geography

 
Administratively, the municipality is divided into 4 civil parishes (freguesias):
 Alvares
 Cadafaz e Colmeal
 Góis
 Vila Nova do Ceira

Culture
There are many religious and/or secular festivals throughout the summer, including one of Portugal's largest Motorbikecompetitions in August (after the one in Faro).

International relations

Góis is twinned with:
   São Paulo, Brazil

References

External links
 Photographs of Góis on Flickr

 
Towns in Portugal
Municipalities of Coimbra District